Shreshta is a Telugu-Language lyricist and writer. She became popular for her lyrics for the songs in the movies, Pelli Choopulu and Arjun Reddy. After her debut, she was lauded as Telugu cinema’s first female lyricist.

Early life
She was born in Mancherial in Adilabad district, Telangana. She is the only child, her father is a businessman and mother a government employee. Her mother a Hindu Brahmin and raised in a devout Hindu family and devotional songs were part of family culture. She was interested in writing from early age. She did her schooling in Mancherial and did her Bachelors in Commerce and LLB at Osmania University. She use to write poems and was encouraged by her grandfather, Panchadhara Venkata Kishan. She first started writing poems when she was in tenth standard.

Career
She was encouraged by popular Telugu language lyricist, Vennelakanti to take up a career in penning lyrics. Initially, she started writing devotional songs, before pushing a career in movies.

Tollywood
She made Tollywood debut in 2013 with the film, Oka Romantic Crime Katha. She also penned lyrics for the Telugu films, Ko Ante Koti and Courier Boy Kalyan. Pelli Choopulu was her 9th movie as a lyricist.

Filmography

Awards
 Debutant Award at Cine Maa Mahila Awards in 2013

References

Telugu-language lyricists